The 2015 European Junior Judo Championships is an edition of the European Junior Judo Championships, organised by the European Judo Union.It was held in Oberwart, Austria from 18 to 20 September 2015. The final day of competition featured team events, with team Russia winning the men's event and team France the women's.

Medal summary

Medal table

Men's events

Women's events

Source Results

References

External links
 

 U21
European Junior Judo Championships
European Championships, U21
Judo competitions in Austria
Judo
Judo, World Championships U21